The Spinnaker  is a high-rise development in Point Waterfront in Durban, South Africa. It is the tallest building in the Point Waterfront Precinct. It was built as part of eThekwini Metropolitan Municipality's Urban regeneration plan and is one of South Africa's most significant property developments.

References

Buildings and structures in Durban
Apartment buildings